The Late Nite Celebrity Show is a Ghanaian television program hosted by Dzifa Affainie on e.tv Ghana. 

The TV program was initially known as The Soccer Celebrity Show as a result of the world cup hosted by South Africa in 2010 and changed into The Late Nite Celebrity Show. It is a talk show that to interview industry players or celebrities in Ghana and the diaspora as well.

References

Ghanaian television series
2010s Ghanaian television series
ETV Ghana original programming